Center Township is one of thirteen townships in Grant County, Indiana, United States. As of the 2010 census, its population was 23,406 and it contained 10,189 housing units. It is home to the Veterans Administration Medical Center.

Geography
The streams of Boots Creek, Deer Creek, Lugar Creek, Massey Creek and Walnut Creek run through this township.

Cities and towns
 Marion (east half)
 Gas City (north edge)

Unincorporated towns
 Bethevan
 Brookhaven
 Dooville
 Home Corner
 Lake Wood
 Shady Hills
(This list is based on USGS data and may include former settlements.)

Adjacent townships
 Washington Township (north)
 Van Buren Township (northeast)
 Monroe Township (east)
 Mill Township (south)
 Franklin Township (west)
 Pleasant Township (northwest)

Cemeteries
The township contains three cemeteries: Burson, Independent Order of Odd Fellows and Marion National.

Major highways

References
 
 United States Census Bureau cartographic boundary files

External links

Townships in Grant County, Indiana
Townships in Indiana